The Dominica Football Association is the governing body of football in Dominica.

The Dominica national football team is the national team of Dominica and is controlled by the Dominica Football Association. The national league of Dominica is the Dominica Championship.

In June 2012, the President of the DFA was removed from his role by the association's members until the end of his term in 2015 for his part in the Caribbean Football Union corruption scandal.

Association staff

External links
 Dominica at the FIFA website
 Dominica at CONCACAF site
  Official site

References

CONCACAF member associations
Football in Dominica
Football
1970 establishments in Dominica
Sports organizations established in 1970